Dianna Agron has appeared in twenty-six feature films, fifteen television series/films, seven music videos, six short films, five stage roles and five concerts, three commercials and a PSA. She has directed five projects and produced four. She has also provided vocals on several soundtrack albums.

Agron's acting career debuted in 2006 with brief film roles, but her first significant role was in CSI:NY as Jessica Grant, who appears in only one episode. After that, in 2006, Agron was featured in many TV series as a minor or recurring character, such as Drake & Josh (2006) and Shark (2006). Agron played Jenny Budosh on Veronica Mars, appearing in three episodes of the third season between 2006 and 2007. Agron was then cast as Debbie Marshall, a mean cheerleader on Heroes. Debbie was featured in five episodes of the second season as an antagonist to the main character Claire Bennet (Hayden Panettiere). In 2007, Agron landed her first main character in It's a Mall World; and later, in 2009, she was cast as Quinn Fabray on the hit musical TV show Glee. Quinn was first introduced as an antagonist, the captain of the cheerleading squad and Finn Hudson's (Cory Monteith) girlfriend. After being part of the regular cast for the first three seasons, Agron moved away from television roles but continued as a guest star for the final three seasons.

In her early film career, Agron appeared in T.K.O. (2007), Skid Marks (2007), The Romantics (2010), and Burlesque (2010). In 2011, Agron portrayed Alice in The Hunters, and the lead role of Sarah Hart in I Am Number Four. Later that year, Agron was featured in Glee: The 3D Concert Movie. Post-Glee, she co-starred as Belle Blake in the 2013 film The Family, alongside Robert De Niro, Michelle Pfeiffer, and Tommy Lee Jones. In 2015, Agron portrayed Dalia in the political thriller Zipper, Finley in the romantic comedy Tumbledown, Sarah Barton in the drama Bare, and narrated part of the film Unity. That same year, she starred in the play McQueen on the West End. In 2017, she appeared in The Crash, Novitiate, and Hollow in the Land. She has performed three self-titled concerts of musical covers. Her feature film directorial debut came with 2019's Berlin, I Love You, in which she also starred. In 2020, she starred in the dark comedy film Shiva Baby, as well as a virtual performance of part of the Kate Cortesi play Is Edward Snowden Single?. In 2021, she appeared in The Laureate and filmed As They Made Us and Acidman.

In 2010, Agron's filmography was discussed by characters of The Office in the episode "Viewing Party".

Film

Television

Audio

Stage

Theatre and performance

Concerts

Music videos

Commercials

As director

Film

Music videos

As producer

Film

Audio

Discography

Soundtracks

2009: Glee: The Music, Volume 1
2010: Glee: The Music, The Power of Madonna
2010: Glee: The Music, Volume 3 Showstoppers
2010: Glee: The Music, Journey to Regionals
2010: Glee: The Music, The Rocky Horror Glee Show
2010: Glee: The Music, The Complete Season One
2010: Glee: The Music, The Christmas Album
2010: Glee: The Music, Volume 4
2010: Glee: The Music, The Complete Season One CD Collection
2011: Glee: The Music, Volume 5
2011: Glee: The Music, Volume 6
2011: Glee: The 3D Concert Movie (Motion Picture Soundtrack)
2011: Glee: The Music, Volume 7
2012: Glee: The Music, The Graduation Album
2012: Glee: The Music, The Complete Season Two
2012: Glee: The Music, The Complete Season Three
2012: Glee: The Music, Season 4, Volume 1
2014: Glee: The Music, The Complete Season Four
2014: Glee: The Music - Celebrating 100 Episodes
2015: Glee: The Music, Homecoming
2015: Glee: The Music, Jagged Little Tapestry
2021: Glee Love Songs

Writing
2016: "Fool You've Landed" (with Winston Marshall and Matthew Field) – Mumford & Sons featuring Beatenberg and the Very Best

References

External links
 

Actress filmographies
American filmographies
Director filmographies
Discographies of American artists
Glee discographies